Musical: The Prince of Tennis is a series of stage musicals based on the manga series The Prince of Tennis by Takeshi Konomi. Throughout the plays' run, several soundtrack albums have been released, as well as character albums released by the actors.

Release information
Each soundtrack that has been released for each musical is a live recording of the performances.

The Musicals (first season)

Musical Tennis no Ohjisama
Musical Tennis no Ohjisama

 This is The Prince of Tennis
 Kore ga Seigaku no Tennis-bu nanoda!
 Kore ga Seigaku no Regular-jin nanoda!
 Ore wa Momo-chan ~ Seigaku no Abarenbou
 I'm Always Winner
 Haji wo Kake! Ryoma
 I'm Always Winner
 The Regulars
 Ore wa Mamushi
 Ore wa Burning
 Eiji vs Fuji ~ Rival na Futari
 The Regulars
 You Got Game?

Remarkable 1st Match Fudomine
 Musical Tennis no Ohjisama — Remarkable 1st Match Fudomine

 The Regulars ~This is the Prince of Tennis~ Victory
 Yappa Otoko wa Doubles Deshou!
 Chiku Yosen 1
 Makezugirai
 Chiku Yosen 2
 Victory
 Golden Pair
 Shinken Shoubu to wa Sou Iu Koto
 Challenge ~ Subete wa Shori no Tameni
 Rhythm ni Noru ze
 Tough
 Spot wo Nerae
 Victory (Reprise)
 Omae wa Seigaku no Hashira ni Nare
 Challenge ~ Subete wa Shori no Tameni (Reprise)
 Victory ~ Omae wa Seigaku no Hashira ni Nare
 You Got Game?

Dream Live 1st
 Musical Tennis no Ohjisama - Dream Live 1st

 Dream Come True
 Kore ga Seigaku Regular-jin nanoda!
 Makezu Kirai
 Ore wa Momo-chan ~ Seigaku no Abarenbou
 Tough
 Kikumaru vs Fuji ~ Rival na Futari
 Golden Pair
 This is The Prince of Tennis
 I'm Always Winner
 The Regulars
 Ore wa Burning!
 Shinkenshoubu to wa Sou Iu Koto (Acoustic Version)
 Now & Forever
 Victory
 Chiku Yosen
 Challenge ~ Subete wa Shori no Tameni
 Victory ~ Omae wa Seigaku no Hashira ni Nare
 Make You Free

More Than Limit St. Rudolph Gakuen
Musical Tennis no Ohjisama - More Than Limit St. Rudolph Gakuen

 Kore ga Totaikai da!
 Aoku Moeru Honoo
 Erabareshi Elite Shuudan
 Rival Ijou Teki Miman
 Bunseki
 Tennis ni Scenario wa nai
 Depend On Me
 Jyuuden Kanryou
 Sanjuushou
 Golden Pair Part 2
 Hand In Hand
 Ore wa Ore no Namae de Yobaretai
 Omae wa Seigaku no Hashira ni Nare
 Ore wa Ue ni Iku yo
 Shizukanaru Toushi
 Aoku Moeru Honoo 2
 Dream Maker
 Dream Come True (instrumental)
 Jyuuden Kanryou (instrumental)
 Now & Forever

In Winter 2004-2005 Side Fudomine ~Special Match~
Musical Tennis no Ohjisama - in winter 2004-2005 Side Fudomine ~Special Match~

 To Victory
 Yappa Otoko wa Doubles Deshou!
 Chiku Yosen 1
 Makezugirai
 I'm Always Winner
 Chiku Yosen 2
 Victory
 Golden Pair
 Shinken Shoubu to wa Sou Iu Koto
 Challenge ~ Subete wa Shouri no Tameni
 Rhythm ni Noruze
 Tough
 Spot wo Narae
 Victory (Reprise)
 Omae wa Seigaku no Hashira ni Nare
 Challenge ~ Subete wa Shouri no Tameni (Reprise)
 Victory ~ Omae wa Seigaku no Hashira ni Nare~
 You Got Game?
 Now & Forever

Side Yamabuki Feat. St. Rudolph Gakuen
Musical Tennis no Ohjisama - in winter 2004-2005 side Yamabuki feat. St. Rudolph Gakuen

 Run Run Run
 Ore ni Sashizu Suru na!
 Shouri no Kami wa Dochira ni Hohoemu?
 Ore wa Ore no Namae de Yobaretai
 Ore wa Ue ni Iku yo
 Power Up de Ikou!
 Semero, Tsuyoku Nare!
 Iyoiyo Keshhou, Totaikai
 Ikuze!
 Oretachi Jimi's
 Good Combination
 Yuuki vs Iji
 Kagayake, Motto
 Run Run Run (Reprise)

Dream Live 2nd
Musical Tennis no Ohjisama - Dream Live 2nd
Disc 1
 Jubilee ~ Run Run Run
 Erabareshi Elite Shuudan
 Shinkenshoubu to wa Souiu Koto
 Ikuze! (Yamabuki Version)
 Kore ga Seigaku Regular-jin nanoda!
 Ore wa Ue ni Iku yo
 Shouri no Kami wa Dochira ni Hohoemu?
 Power Up de Ikou!
 Semero, Tsuyoku Nare!
 The Regulars
Disc 2
 Aoku Moeru Honoo
 Challenge ~ Subete wa Shouri no Tameni
 Bunseki
 Rhythm ni Noruze
 Oretachi Jimi's
 Good Combination
 Ore wa Ore no Namae de Yobaretai ~Acoustic Version~
 Ore ni Sashizu Suru na!
 Yuuki vs Iji
 Victory ~ Ikuze!
 Kagayake, Motto
 Crystal
 Jubilee ~ Final Dance Version
 Endo's Graduation Speech

The Imperial Match Hyoutei Gakuen
Musical Tennis no Ohjisama - The Imperial Match Hyoutei Gakuen

 Do Your Best!
 Kounai Ranking Sen ~ Versus
 Data wa Uso o Tsukanai yo
 Yudan Sezu ni Ikou
 Sorezore no Omoi
 Koori no Emperor
 Kumiawase Chusenkai
 Sorezore no Omoi II ~ Yudan Sezu ni Ikou II
 Yume wo Tsunage
 Katsu no wa Hyotei
 Sannin de Doubles
 Moeruze BURNING!
 Koori no Emperor II
 Oresama no Bigi ni Bugi Wugi
 Aitsu Koso ga Tennis no Oujisama
 Yume no Tsunage II
 Do Your Best! (Reprise)

The Imperial Match Hyoutei Gakuen in Winter
Musical Tennis no Ohjisama - The Imperial Match Hyoutei Gakuen in winter 2005-2006

While no actual soundtrack was released for this musical (because it was a rerun of the previous performance), there were three additional songs ("Ikkiuchi", "Crystal" and "On My Way") for this performance that weren't included in the previous soundtrack, but a CD single was released for the song, "On My Way".

 Do Your Best!
 Kounai Ranking Sen ~ Versus
 Data wa Uso o Tsukanai yo
 Yudan Sezu ni Ikou
 Sorezore no Omoi
 Koori no Emperor
 Kumiawase Chusenkai
 Sorezore no Omoi II ~ Yudan Sezu ni Ikou II
 Yume wo Tsunage
 Katsu no wa Hyotei
 Sannin de Doubles
 Moeruze Burning!
 Koori no Emperor II
 Oresama no Bigi ni Bugi Wugi
 Ikkiuchi
 Aitsu Koso ga Tennis no Oujisama
 Yume no Tsunage II
 Do Your Best! (Reprise)
 Crystal
 On My Way

Dream Live 3rd
Musical Tennis no Ohjisama - Dream Live 3rd

 On My Way (Opening Version, Instrumental)
 Do Your Best! (Rap, Hyoutei Version)
 Do Your Best!
 Data wa Uso Tsukanai Yo
 Sannin de Doubles
 Good Combination
 Moeruze Burning!
 Koori no Emperor
 Makezugirai
 Sorezore no Omoi - Yudan Sezu ni Ikou
 Katsu no wa Hyotei
 Sakaki no Heya
 Koori no Emperor II
 Ore-sama no Bigi ni Boogie Woogie
 Season
 Aitsu koso ga Tennis no Oujisama
 Yume wo Tsunage
 Ichinen Trio Medley
 Crystal
 On My Way
 Run Run Run
 Run Run Run (Encore)

Advancement Match Rokkaku feat. Hyotei Gakuen
 Musical Tennis no Ohjisama - Advancement Match Rokkaku feat. Hyoutei Gakuen

 Try Again Seigaku
 Gekokujou
 My Best Tension
 Forward, My Men!
 Kantou Taikai Junkesshou da ze!
 Court de ao!
 Yudan Sezu ni Ikou
 Shaba daba dabide
 Power is the Best
 Remember Hyoutei
 Kantou Taikai Junkesshou da ze! 2
 Acrobatics & Genius
 Kagami no Naka no Ore
 Kagami no Naka no Ore 2
 Onnanoko to Chuu
 Pressure
 ROAD
 Forward, My Men! ~ Try Again Seigaku
 Season
 On My Way

Absolute King Rikkai feat. Rokkaku ~ First Service
 Musical Tennis no Ohjisama - Absolute King Rikkai feat. Rokkaku ~ First Service

 Must Be Strong!
 Hijou no Tennis
 Must Be Strong! II
 Kiken na Game
 Kiken na Game II
 Bloodshot
 Kyou made... Soshite Ashita kara
 Yuujuou no Tennis
 Hijou no Tennis II
 Katsu tameni
 Finalist
 Climax
 Haiagare Kaidou
 Fukkatsu! Golden Pair
 Petenshi daa? Nan to demo i.e.
 Oishi no Territory
 Kore ga Shoubu toiu mono
 Mou mayoi wa nai
 Next
 Must be Strong! III ~ Finalist II
 On My Way

Dream Live 4th
Musical Tennis no Ohjisama - Dream Live 4th
Disk One
 Overture ~ Opening
 My Best Tension
 Oishi no Territory
 Fukkatsu! Golden Pair
 Depend on Me
 Haiagare Kaidou
 Hijou no Tennis
 Bloodshot
 Petenshi daa Nan todemo Ie
 Kore ga Shoubu to iu Mono
 Court de Aou!
 Onnanoko to Chuu
 Acrobatics & Genius
Disk Two
 Dream Maker
 Yume wo Tsunage
 Ikuze!!
 Kagayake, Motto
 ROAD
 Climax
 Shabadaba Davide
 Power is the Best ~ Moeruze Burning!
 Kiken na Game
 Mou Mayoi wa Nai
 Must be Strong! ~ Finalist
 TOP OF THE STAGE FOR THE TENNIS
 F・G・K・S
 On My Way

Absolute King Rikkai feat. ~ Second Service
 Musical Tennis no Ohjisama - Absolute King Rikkai feat. ~ Second Service

 Omaera...Gakeppuchi Giri Giri
 Koko kara ga...Ore-tachi
 Yo nen to Ni ka getsu to Jyu go Nichi
 Ore wa Kakou wo Ryou ga suru
 Yo nen to Ni ka getsu to Jyu go Nichi II
 Cha Cha ttoTsubusuze ~Bloodshot
 Kachi ni Shyuchaku suru
 Makeru koto no Yurusarenai Oujya ~ Hijou no Tennis
 Kamigakari no Tennis ~ Dakara Katsu no wa...
 Kimi wo Shinjiteru
 Fu Rin Ka Zan
 Ore wo Taose ~ Omae wa Seigaku Hashira ni nare
 Samurai
 TOP OF THE STAGE FOR THE TENNIS
 Minami no Shima Kita Shikyaku
 Koko kara ga Ore-tachi II
 F.G.K.S

The Progressive Match Higa Chuu feat. Rikkai
 Musical Tennis no Ohjisama - The Progressive Match Higa Chuu feat. Rikkai

 Iyo Iyo Zenkokutaikai
 Yomigaerishi mono
 Brand new Seigaku
 Fight & Win
 Ore-tachi no Jisho ni Haiboku wa Nai
 Dark Horse
 Hitotsu yari nokoshita koto
 Maku wa Kitte Otosareta
 Be Cool
 Heat up
 Tennis to wa...
 Viking horn
 Kourin Suru Ouja
 Ore wa Koroshiya to Yobareru Otoko
 Hyakuren Jitoku no Kiwami
 Reunion ~ Heat Up II
 F. G. K. S

Dream Live 5th
Musical Tennis no Ohjisama - Dream Live 5th
Disk One
 Overture ~ Opening
 Seigaku Medley: Aoku Moeru Honoo ~ Run・Run・Run ~ THIS IS THE PRINCE OF TENNIS ~ Brand New Seigaku
 Ore-tachi no Jisho ni Haiboku wa Nai
 Makeru koto no Yurusarenai Oujya ~ Hijou no Tennis
 Fuurinkazan
 Minami no Shima Kita Shikyaku ~ Dark Horse
 Tennis to wa...
 Hitotsu yari nokoshita koto
 Yomigaerishi mono
 Ore wa Koroshiya to Yobareru Otoko
 Ore wa Ue ni Iku yo ~ Be Cool
 Ore ni sashizu suruna!
 Omaera Gakeppuchi Giri Giri ~ Koko kara ga... Ore-tachi
 Semero, tsuyoku nare!
 Bonus Track : Erabareshi Elite Shuudan
Disk Two
 Viking Horn
 Petenshi daa Nan todemo Ie
 Golden Pair
 Jyuuden Kanryou
 Ore wa Mamushi
 The Regulars
 Kimi wo Shinjiteru ~ Mou Mayoi wa Nai
 Oretachi no Aikotoba
 Forward, my Men ~ Try Again
 Reunion ~ Heat Up II
 F・G・K・S
 On My Way

The Imperial Presence Hyotei feat. Higa Chuu
The Imperial Presence Hyotei feat. Higa Chuu - Hyotei A Cast

 Hyoutenka no Jounetsu
 Zengoku taikan Junjun kesshou da!
 The Top
 Versus - VS
 Poker Face Fighter ~ Active Volcano
 Sekkachi
 Kazu to Gekiryuu
 Jimonjitou
 Futoufukusu e no Homage 
 Heavy Rain
 The Top II
 Synchro
 Koori no Sekai
 Ore Wa Moeru
 Tie Break
 Refresh Arata na Jibun e
 Hyoutenka no Jounetsu II - The Top III
 F. G. K. S

The Treasure Match Shitenhouji feat. Hyotei Gakuen
 Musical Tennis no Oujisama - The Treasure Match Shitenhouji feat. Hyotei Gakuen

 One More Step
 Kejime
 Katta Mon Gachi Ya
 Ecstasy
 Boku Wa Kawaru
 GO GO FUJI! GO SHIRAISHI!
 Isshin Doutai
 Bukiyou'ssu Kara
 Isshou Ippai
 Yuzurenai Priority - One More Step
 Shinu Ki De Burning!
 Hyakuren Jitoku No Kiwami VS Saiki Kanpatsu No Kiwami
 Tenimuhou No Kiwami Ichiban Chikai Otoko
 Koitsu Wo Taoshitai
 This Is My Best
 Ore-tachi No Aikotoba
 F. G. K. S

Dream Live 6th
Musical Tennis no Ohjisama - Dream Live 6th
Disk One

 Overture
 Do Your Best!
 Koori no Emperor ~Hyoutenka no Jounestu
 Katta Mon Gachi Ya
 Ecstasy ~GO GO FUJI! GO SHIRAISHI!
 Boku Wa Kawaru
 Kore ga Shoubu to iu Mono ~Hijou no Tennis
 Ore wa Koroshiya to Yobareru Otoko
 Yudan Sezu ni Ikou
 SAMURAI
 Koori no Sekai
 Ore wa Moeru
 Omae wa Seigaku no Hashira ni Nare
 Isshin Doutai
 Bukiyou'ssu Kara
 Kikumaru vs Fuji~Rival na Futari~Good Combination
 Koitsu Wo Taoshitai
Disk Two
 Kejime
 Shinu Ki De Burning!
 Pokerface Fighter ~ Active Volcano
 REMEMBER HYOTEI
 Heavy Rain
 Challenge ~Sube Wa Shouri no Tameni
 Ore-tachi no Aikotoba
 Now & Forever
 One More Step ~ The Top
 This is my Best!
 Refresh Arata na Jibun e
 On My Way
 F.G.K.S

Final Match Rikkai First feat. Shitenhouji
 WINNING ROAD
 CHECKMATE!
 FuuRinKaInZanRai
 Tezuka PHANTOM
 Yudan sezu ni ikou 2009
 Sago he no CANON
 Ore no Senpai
 Akai DEVIL
 Ore no Senpai/ Ore no Kohai
 Sanrenpa ni shikaku nashi
 Uchira no HEART wa PERCUSSION
 PINCH
 Kokoro no Hitomi ~ CLOSED EYE!
 ILLUSION
 PLATINUM PAIR
 Saigo no GOLDEN PAIR
 Omoidase Echizen!
 CHECKMATE! ~ WINNING ROAD
 F.G.K.S.

Final Match Rikkai Second feat. the Rivals

 MATCH POINT
 HIGHLIGHT
 Boku wa dare?
 Omoidase, Echizen! 2
 Arata na sekai he
 RIVALS
 Seisei Doudou
 RIVALS - Atobe
 RIVALS (reprise)
 Kami no Ko
 DEAD END
 Ore wa iku
 Shinogi wo Kezuru monotachi
 Saishuu kessen
 Kore de mou owari kai?
 LEVEL UP
 Yukimura no TENNIS
 Kurayami ~ Boku wa dare? (reprise)
 Ten'imuhou no Kiwami
 Omae wa PRINCE
 BANZAI
 GRADUATION
 FINAL MEDLEY
 DESTINY
 On My Way
 F・G・K・S

Dream Live 7th
Disc one
 Overture
 ON MY WAY (opening version)
 WINNING ROAD
 Seigaku MEDLEY - For Dream Live 7th (MATCH POINT ~ Aoku Moeru Honoo ~ RUN RUN RUN ~ BRAND NEW SEIGAKU ~ DO YOUR BEST! ~ MATCH POINT)
 Rikkai MEDLEY (Oretachi no Jisho ni Haiboku wa nai ~ Makeru koto no Yurusarenai Ouji ~ Hijou no TENNIS)
 Omaera...gakeppuchi Girigiri
 DEAD END
 Uchira no HEART wa PERCUSSION
 RIVALS For Dream Live 7th ~ Shinogi wo Kezuru monotachi (Rivals ~ SPOT wo nerae ~ Shinken Shoubu to wa sou iu koto ~ Ore ni sashizusuruna ~ Yuuki VS Iji ~ ore wa ore no namae de yobaratai ~ COURT de aou! ~ DARK HORSE ~ Rivals - Atobe ~ Aitsukoso TENNIS no Oujisama ~ Rivals (reprise) ~ Shinogi wo kezuru monotachi)
 Yudan sezu ni ikou 2009
 VICTORY ~ Omae wa Seigaku no Hashira ni nare
 Semero, Tsuyoku Nare!
 Kagayake, Motto

Disc Two
 Katta Mon Gachi ya ~ Isshin Doutai
 ECSTASY
 ILLUSION
 Kokoro no Hitomi ~ CLOSED EYE
 Yukimura no TENNIS
 FuuRinKaInZanRai ~ FuuRinKaZan
 Omoidase, Echizen! For Dream Live 7th
 Boku wa dare? (reprise) ~ Ten'imuhou no Kiwami
 Kore ga Seigaku regular jin na no da!
 Shodai MEDLEY For Dream Live 7th (Ore wa momo-chan~Seigaku no abaren bou ~ Tough ~ ore wa BURNING ~ Kikumaru VS Fuji~RIVAL na Futari)
 THIS IS THE PRINCE OF TENNIS
 DESTINY
 Forward, my men!
 Saigo no GOLDEN PAIR
 Aitsukoso ga TENNIS no oujisama ~ I'M ALWAYS WINNER
 GRADUATION
 This is my best! ~ REUNION ~ Heat Up II
 BANZAI ~ Omae wa PRINCE
 Season
 F.G.K.S
 On my Way

The Musicals (second season)

Seigaku VS Fudomine
 THIS IS THE PRINCE OF TENNIS
 Kore ga Seigaku no TENNIS bu na no da
 Ore wa Momo-chan ~ Seigaku no abaran bou
 Kore ga Seigaku regular jin na no da! (2nd Season ver.)
 I'M ALWAYS WINNER ~ The Regulars
 Ore wa Mamushi
 The Regulars (Reprise)
 Makezugirai
 Chiku yosen (2nd season ver.)
 VICTORY
 Challenge ~ subete wa shouri no tame ni
 Golden Pair
 Shinken Shoubu to wa sou iu koto
 Rhythm ni noruze
 SPOT wo nerae
 Ore no touzen
 VICTORY (reprise)
 Omae wa Seigaku no hashira ni nare
 Challenge ~ Subete wa shouri no tame ni (reprise)
 Jumping up! High touch!

Seigaku VS St.Rudolph/Yamabuki
 24 - 365
 Erabareshi Elite shuudan
 Rivals ijou teki miman
 Medley - Depend on me ~ Jyuuden kanryou
 Scenario wo buchi kowase!
 Medley - Hand in Hand ~ Marionette
 Ore ni sashizu suru na!
 ore wa ue ni iku yo
 Marionette (reprise)
 Shizuka naru toushi
 Dream Maker
 Medley - ikuze ~100% no kokoro
 oretachi jimii's
 Lucky Sengoku
 Yuuki VS Iji
 Kagayake, motto
 24 - 365 (reprise)
 Jumping up! High touch!

Seigaku VS Hyoutei 
 Get The Victory!
 Kounai Ranking sen
 Data wa uso wo tsukanai yo
 Yudan sezu ni yukou 2011
 Itetsuku mono no atsuki omoi short ver.
 Ore wo regular ni
 Sorezore no omoi ~ Yudan sezu ni yukou
 Yume wo tsunage
 Katsu no wa Hyoutei
 Sannin de doubles
 Moeru ze Burning!
 Itetsuku mono no atsuki omoi
 Yoishirero bolero
 Ikki uchi
 Shin · Aitsu koso ga Tennis no oujisama
 Tomorrow For You & I
 Get The Victory! II
 Jumping up! High touch!

Dream Live 2011
 Opening 24／365
 Get The Victory！
 Erabareshi elite shuudan
 100% no kokoro
 Koori no emperor
 Shinken shoubu to wa souiu koto
 Yudan sezu ni yukou~Yudan sezu ni yukou 2011
 Katsu no wa Hyoutei
 Ore wo regular ni
 Oresama no bigi ni boogie woogie
 ore wa ue ni iku yo~Ore no touzen ~My best tension
 Lucky Sengoku
 Rhythm ni noru ze
 Juuden kanryou
 a.Koori no emperor (acoustic ver.)/ b.Hand in Hand & Marionette
 Shizukanaru toushi
 Dream Maker
 Tomorrow   For You & I
 Do Your Best！
 Data wa uso wo tsukanai yo
 Rival ijou tekimiman feat. Ore wa momo-chan/ Tough
 Yappa otoko wa doubles deshou
 Golden pair
 Yume wo tsunage
 Itetsuku mono no atsuki omoi
 Yoishirero Bolero
 Challenge ~ Subete wa shouri no tame ni
 The regulars
 VICTORY
 Season
 That's My Future！Let's   Go！
 Jumping up! High touch!

Seigaku VS Rokkaku
 The best players
 Renshuu Insuto ~ Omae wa Seigaku no hashira ni nare
 Kantou taikai junkesshou daze!
 Court de aou!
 Wasuregataki tatakai
 Forward, my men!
 Bane-Davi Sukatto scat
 Power is the best (new version)
 Remember Hyoutei
 Kantou taikai junkesshou daze! II
 Acrobatic & Genius (new version)
 Kagami no naka no ore (ballad)
 Kagami no naka no ore II
 Onna no ko to chuu (new version)
 Onna no ko to chuu II
 Pressure
 Standby
 Forward, my men!～TRY AGAIN
 ROAD
 That's my future！ Let's go ！
 Jumping Up！High touch！

Seigaku VS Rikkai
 Hijou no Tennis
 Must be strong!
 Kiken na game
 Bloodshot
 Yuujou no tennis
 Hijou no tennis II
 Katsu tame ni
 Climax
 Haiagare Kaidoh
 Mattero yo Momoshiro
 Pentenshi daa? Nanto demo i.e.
 Ooishi no territory ~Fukkatsu! Golden Pair
 Kore ga shoubu to iu mono
 NEXT
 Makeru koto no yurusarenai ouja ~ Hijou no tennis
 Omaera.. gakeppuchi girigiri
 Koko kara ga... oretachi
 yonen to nikagetsu to juugonichi
 Oretachi wa kako wo ryougasuru
 yonen to nikagetsu to juugonichi II
 Kachi ni shuuchaku otoko
 Dakara katsu no wa...
 Shinjiteru ~ mou mayoi wa nai
 Fuurinkazan
 ore wo taose ~ Omae wa Seigaku no hashira ni nare
 SAMURAI
 Good Bye Today
 Koko kara ga... oretachi II
 That's my future！ Let's go ！

Seigaku Farewell Party
 Kore ga Seigaku regular jin na no da!
 Get the Victory! ~ The best players
 Standby
 Shizukanaru toushi
 Data wa uso wo tsukanai yo
 Court de aou!
 Omaera...gakepucchi girigiri
 Bloodshot
 Do your best!
 Yudan sezu ni yukou 2011
 SAMURAI
 Haiagare Kaidoh ~ Mattero yo Momoshiro
 Ore wa burning
 Yume wo tsunage
 Sannin de doubles
 Acrobatic & genius (new version)
 Mou mayoi wa nai
 Tomorrow For You & I
 Ichinen trio medley
 Good Bye Today
 Forward, my men!～TRY AGAIN
 ROAD
 NEXT～Must Be Strong！～Finalist
 That's My Future！Let's Go！～Jumping up！ High touch！

Seigaku VS Higa
Iyoiyo zenkoku taikai
 Yomigaerishi mono
 Brand New Seigaku 2012
 Fight & Win
 Oretachi no jisho ni haiboku wa nai
 Dark Horse 2012
 Hitotsu yarinokoshita koto
 Maku wa kitte otosareta
 Be Cool
 Heat Up
 Tennis to wa...
 Viking
 Hitori de doubles
 Shuunen no homura
 Ore wa koroshiya to yobareru otoko
 Tezuka Zone
 Reunion~Heat Up II
 WE ARE ALWAYS TOGETHER

Dream Live 2013
 Iyoiyo zenkoku taikai
 Opening~24/365
 Run Run Run
 Makeru koto no yurusarenai ouja~Hijou no tennis
 Koori no emperor~Itetsuku mono no atsuki omoi
 Minami no shima kara kita shikaku~Dark Horse 2012
 Be Cool
 Tough
 Power up de ikou!
 Yomigaerishi mono
 Hitotsu yarinokoshita koto~court de aou!
 Tennis to wa...
 Kagami no naka no ore~Kagami no naka no ore II
 Semero, Tsuyoku nare!
 Koko kara ga... oretachi
 Petenshi daa? Nanto demo i.e.
 Ore wa koroshiya to yobareru otoko
 Kikumaru VS Fuji~Rival na futari
 Hitori de doubles
 Depend on me
 Kore ga shoubu to iu mono
 Fuurinkazan
 Brand New Seigaku 2012
 REMEMBER HYOUTEI
 Viking
 Kimi wo shinjiteru ~ Mou mayoi wa nai
 Kourin suru ouja
 I'M ALWAYS WINNER
 Challenge ~ Subete wa shouri no tame ni
 Reunion ~ Heat Up
 Kagayake Motto
 On My Way～Jumping up! High touch!
 WE ARE ALWAYS TOGETHER
 You got game?
 Shinken shoubu wa souiu koto
 THAT'S MY FUTURE ! LET'S GO!～F・G・K・S

The Musical Prince of Tennis - Best Actor's Series

Shirota Yuu as Tezuka Kunimitsu
Musical Prince of Tennis The Best Actors Series 001 - Shirota Yuu as Tezuka Kunimitsu (The Imperial Match Hyotei Gakuen Memorial Album)

Released on December 19, 2005.

 Owari Naki Stage
 Ashita Fuku Kaze
 Tachitsukusu Kanata
 Instrumental ~ Tezuka vs Inui
 Yudan Sezu ni Ikou (Kunimitsu Solo Edition)
 Instrumental ~ Kikumaru・Momoshiro vs Oshitari・Mukahi
 Semero, Tsuyoku Nare
 Instrumental ~ Fuji vs Akutagawa
 Omae wa Seigaku no Hashira ni Nare (Kunimitsu Solo Edition)
 Yuu Shirota Message for You

Katou Kazuki as Atobe Keigo
Musical Prince of Tennis The Best Actors Series 002 - Kazuki Katou as Atobe Keigo (The Imperial Match Hyotei Gakuen Memorial Album)

Released on December 19, 2005.

 Koori no Emperor (Keigo Solo Edition)
 Instrumental ~ Inui・Kaidou vs Shishido・Ohtori
 Instrumental ~ Kawamura vs Kabaji
 Oresama no Bigi ni Boogie-Woogie
 Instrumental ~ Tezuka vs Atobe
 Do Your Best! (Keigo Solo Edition)
 Higher!
 Solitaire
 Kazuki  Katou Message for you
 Flaming Ice

Aiba Hiroki as Fuji Syuusuke
Musical Prince of Tennis The Best Actors Series 003 - Hiroki Aiba as Fuji Syuusuke

Released on July 26, 2006.

 Tsubasa no Kizuna
 Shootin' your smile
 Yume no Kidou
 Instrumental ~ Fuji vs Ryoma
 Yume wo Tsunage ... Syuusuke Solo Edition
 HAND IN HAND
 Instrumental ~ Fuji vs Akutagawa Jirou DL3. KIRA★KIRA ver.
 Instrumental ~ Fuji vs Mizuki
 Run Run Run — Brother's Edition
 Aiba Hiroki & KENN Message for You

Saitou Takumi as Oshitari Yuushi & Aoyagi Ruito as Mukahi Gakuto
Musical Prince of Tennis The Best Actors Series 004 - Saitou Takumi as Yuushi Oshitari & Aoyagi Ruito as Gakuto Mukahi

Released on July 26, 2006.

 Instrumental ~ On My Way DL3 ver.
 Katsu no wa Hyoutei
 Do Your Best! RAP! ver.
 Instrumental ~ Kounai RANKING Sen
 Instrumental ~ Kawabe ni Te
 Makezugirai ~ Yuushi and Gakuto Edition
 Bohemian Blue
 Jump to it!
 Missing Piece
 Saitou Takumi & Aoyagi Ruito Message for You

Sakurada Doori as Echizen Ryoma
Musical Prince of Tennis The Best Actors Series 005 - Sakurada Doori as Ryoma Echizen

Released on December 16, 2006.

 I want it all
 NO MYSELF NO LIFE
 Eien no Baton
 Instrumental ~ Ryoma vs Hiyoshi
 My Best Tension
 Instrumental ~ Kawamura・Momoshiro vs Amane・Kurobane II
 Instrumental ~ Kaidou vs Aoi
 Forward, my men! ... RK Edition
 ROAD
 Sakurada Doori & Minami Keisuke Message for you

IRE as Amane Hikaru and Shindou Gaku as Kurobane Harukaze
Musical Prince of Tennis The Best Actor's Series 006 - IRE as Hikaru Amane and Shindou Gaku as Harukaze Kurobane

Released on December 16, 2006.

 DABIBANE DANSU
 Gouin ni GOING MY WAY
 Blast
 Court de Aou ~ D2 Edition
 Instrumental ~ Kawamura・Momoshiro vs Amane・Kurobane
 SHABADABA DABIDE
 Instrumental ~ Fuji・Kikumaru vs Saeki・Itsuki
 Instrumental ~ ACROBATIC & GENIUS
 Forward, my men!～TRY AGAIN ... DA・VI・BA・NE Edition
 IRE & Shindo Gaku Message for you

Takiguchi Yukihiro as Oishi Syuuichirou & Seto Kouji as Kikumaru Eiji

Nakagauchi Masataka as Niou Masaharu and Baba Tooru as Yagyuu Hiroshi
Musical Prince of Tennis The Best Actors Series 008 - Nakagauchi Masataka as Niou Masaharu and Baba Tooru as Yagyuu Hiroshi

Released on July 25, 2007.

 SUMMER BREEZE
 Jibun wo Shinjite
 I SHOULD
 Depend on me ... Rikkai D1 Edition
 Instrumental ~ Ryoma vs Kirihara I
 Instrumental ~ Momoshiro & Kaidou vs Kuwahara & Marui I
 Petenshi daa? Nan To De Mo Ie
 Instrumental ~ Oishi & Kikumaru vs Niou & Yagyuu II
 Must Be Strong ~ Finalist ... Rikkai D1 Edition
 Nakagauchi Masataka & Baba Tooru Message for you

Kanesaki Kentarou as Sanada Genichirou  and Yagami Ren as  Yukimura Seiichi 
Musical Prince of Tennis The Best Actors Series 009 - Kanesaki Kentarou as Sanada Genichirou and Yagami Ren as Yukimura Seiichi

Released on December 22, 2007.

 Galaxy
 HOLIDAY
 Hatsukoi
 Instrumental ~ Inui vs Yanagi
 Makeru Koto no Yurusarenai Ouja ~ Hijou no Tennis ... 2-TOP Edition
 Instrumental ~ Fuji vs Kirihara
 Instrumental ~ Ryoma vs Sanada
 Kimi Wo Shinjiteru
 Mou Mayoi wa Nai
 Kanesaki Kentarou & Yagami Ren Message for you

3rd Generation Seigaku Regulars
Musical Prince of Tennis The Best Actors Series 010 Extra - Seigaku 3rd Regulars Memorial Edition

Released on December 22, 2007.

 ALWAYS
 TRY AGAIN SEIGAKU
 Power is the best
 Yonnen to Nikagetsu to Juugonichi
 Kachi ni Shuuchaku Suru Otoko
 Ore Wa Taose ~ Omae wa Seigaku no Hashira ni Nare
 SAMURAI
 Koko Kara Ga... Ore-tachi II
 TOP OF THE STAGE FOR THE TENNIS
 Seigaku 3rd Generation Regulars Message for you

Daisuke Watanabe as Tezuka Kunimitsu
Musical Prince of Tennis The Best Actors Series 011 - Watanabe Daisuke as Tezuka Kunimitsu
Released on July 30, 2008.

 DASH!
 Jewel in my heart
 Blazing Shine
 Instrumental ~ Tezuka vs Kite
 Yomi ga erashi mono
 Instrumental ~ Ryoma Echizen vs Kei Tanishi II
 Instrumental ~ Fuji . Kawamura vs Chinen . Rin Hirakoba I
 Semero, tsuyoku nare! ... Kunimitsu Solo Edition
 Aoku moeru honoo ... Kunimitsu Solo Edition
 Watanabe Daisuke Message for you

Luke.C as Kite Eishirou
Musical Prince of Tennis The Best Actors Series 012 - Luke.C as Kite Eishirou
Released on July 30, 2008.

 DEAD OR ALIVE
 Minami no Shima kara kita Shikaku
 Instrumental ~ Ryoma Echizen vs Kei Tanishi I
 Dark Horse
 Ore wa koroshi ya to yobareta otoko
 Instrumental ~ Kikumaru Eiji vs Kai Yuujirou
 Instrumental ~ Fuji ・ Kawamura VS Chinen ・ Hirakoba Rin II
 Buddies
 No Tears
 Luke C. Message for you

References

External links
 

Musicals based on anime and manga
Prince of Tennis
The Prince of Tennis